Carlton the "Mediterranean of the Methow" is an unincorporated community in Okanogan County, Washington, United States. Carlton has a post office with ZIP code 98814.

See also
Carlton Complex Fire
Methow River
Twisp, Washington
Winthrop, Washington
Mazama, Washington

References

Unincorporated communities in Okanogan County, Washington
Unincorporated communities in Washington (state)
Populated places in the Okanagan Country